Öztürk, meaning 'core Turk', is a common Turkish name.

Given name
 Öztürk Karataş (born 1991), Turkish footballer
 Öztürk Serengil (1930-1999), Turkish actor and comedian

Surname
 Abdullah Öztürk (born 1989), Turkish para table tennis player
 Akın Öztürk (born 1952), Turkish general
 Ali Öztürk (footballer born 1986), Turkish footballer
 Ali Öztürk (footballer born 1987), Turkish footballer
 Ali Öztürk (para table tennis) (born 1993)
 Ali İsmet Öztürk (born 1964), Turkish aerobatics pilot
 Alim Öztürk (born 1992), Turkish footballer
 Alpaslan Öztürk (born 1993), Turkish footballer
 Atacan Öztürk (born 1982), Turkish footballer
 Aykut Öztürk (born 1987), Turkish footballer
 Beyazıt Öztürk (born 1969), Turkish television personality
 Emre Öztürk (born 1986), German footballer of Turkish origin
 Engin Öztürk (born 1983), Turkish actor
 Erkan Öztürk (born 1983), Turkish-German footballer
 Fadıl Öztürk (born 1955), Kurdish writer and poet
 Fatih Öztürk (born 1986), Turkish professional footballer
 Fatih Öztürk (born 1983), Turkish footballer
 Gökhan Öztürk (born 1990), Turkish footballer
 Halis Öztürk (1888-1977), Kurdish chieftain and Turkish politician
 Hüseyin Öztürk (born 1928), Turkish basketball player
 İbrahim Öztürk (born 1981), Turkish footballer
 Korhan Öztürk (born 1982), Turkish footballer
  Kübra Öztürk (born 1991), Turkish Woman Grand Master chess player
 Mehlika Öztürk (born 1997), Turkish female wrestler
 Melike Öztürk (born 2001), Turkish women's footballer
 Mertan Caner Öztürk (born 1992), Turkish footballer
 Mevlüde Öztürk (born 1988), Turkish women's footballer
 Murat Öztürk (born 1969), Turkish football coach
 Murat Öztürk (aviator) (1953-2013), Turkish aerobatic pilot
 Okan Öztürk (born 1977), Turkish footballer
 Özhan Öztürk (born 1968), Turkish writer
 Recep Öztürk (born 1977), Turkish footballer
 Sebahattin Öztürk (born 1962), Turkish politician, civil servant and bureaucrat who served as the Minister of the Interior of Turkey between March and August 2015.
 Selçuk Öztürk (born 1972), Dutch politician of Turkish descent
 Semin Öztürk Şener (born 1991), Turkish female aerobatics pilot
 Sevilay Öztürk (born 2003), Turkish female Paralympic swimmer
 Sezer Öztürk (born 1985), Turkish footballer
 Tanju Öztürk (born 1989), Turkish-German footballer
 Yaşar Nuri Öztürk (1945–2016), Turkish theologian, lawyer, columnist
 Yusuf Öztürk (boxer) (born 1973), Turkish boxer
 Yusuf Öztürk (footballer) (born 1979), Turkish footballer

Turkish-language surnames
Turkish masculine given names